Anneli Sauli (6 August 1932 – 15 March 2022) was a Finnish film actress. She appeared in more than 40 films since 1953. She starred in the film Miriam, which was entered into the 8th Berlin International Film Festival. She was born in Pyhäjoki, Finland to a Finnish Romani father, Valdemar Schwartz, and a Finnish mother, Salli Maria Heikkilä. From the late 1950s to the early 1960s she lived and worked in West Germany using the name Ann Savo.

Sauli was married to film director-actor Åke Lindman from 1956 to 1962, and to director-actor Jaakko Pakkasvirta from 1965 to 1968. She had one daughter.

Sauli died in Helsinki on 15 March 2022, at the age of 89.

Selected filmography
 We Come During Spring (1953)
 The Milkmaid (1953)
 1918 (1957)
 Miriam (1957)
 No Tomorrow (1957)
 Restless Night (1958)
 Mrs. Warren's Profession (1960)
 The Dead Eyes of London (1961)
 Doctor Sibelius (1962)
 The Testament of Dr. Mabuse (1962)
 The Seventh Victim (1964)
 Der Hexer (1964)
 Let Not One Devil Cross the Bridge (1968)
 A Baltic Tragedy (1970)
 The Man Without a Past (2002)

References

External links

1932 births
2022 deaths
20th-century Finnish actresses
21st-century Finnish actresses
People from Pyhäjoki
Finnish film actresses
Finnish expatriates in West Germany
Finnish people of Romani descent